The Massachusetts Avenue Bridge could mean

Charles C. Glover Memorial Bridge, in Northwest Washington, D.C.
Harvard Bridge, between Cambridge and Back Bay, Boston in Massachusetts, also known as the MIT  or Smoot Bridge